Arlesey is a town and civil parish in Bedfordshire.  It is near the border with Hertfordshire, about three miles north-west of Letchworth Garden City, four miles north of Hitchin and six miles south of Biggleswade. Arlesey railway station provides services to London, Stevenage and Peterborough.  
The Domesday Book mentions Arlesey. The town's name means the 'island of a man named Aelfric'.

Demography
The population of Arlesey was 5,584 in 2,344 households in the 2011 census. In the census of 2011, 94.0% of people described themselves as white, 2.2% as having mixed or multiple ethnic groups, 2.9% as being Asian or British Asian, and less than 1.0% as having another ethnicity. In the same census, 55.8% described themselves as Christian, 34.6% described themselves as having no religion, 6.8% did not specify a religion, 1.2% described themselves as Sikh, and 1.7% described themselves as having a different religion.

Culture and community
Arlesey Old Moat and Glebe Meadows, adjacent to Arlesey railway station, is a nature reserve managed by the Wildlife Trust for Bedfordshire, Cambridgeshire and Northamptonshire, together with Arlesey Conservation for Nature.

The Arlesey Bomb fishing weight was developed by angler Dick Walker to catch specimen perch from the local chalk pits.

Industry
Arlesey had a thriving brick making industry through to the mid twentieth century.  As of 1900 there were five brickworks around the town.  They were known for the Arlesey White bricks produced from Gault clay. Bricks have not been produced there since 1992. Some clay pits have been used for landfill and others are now lakes.  On the south east side of the town there were two chalk pits operated by the Portland Cement Company.  The Blue Lagoon is now used for sailing and the Green Lagoon for fishing.

Religious sites
St Peter's Church in Church End was built in the 12th century by the monks of Waltham Abbey. Arlesey was also the site of Etonbury Castle, of which little trace remains.
There is also a Methodist church in Arlesey.

Notable residents

 Bill Kitchener - former professional footballer - West Ham United F.C., Torquay United F.C.
 Pat Kruse - former professional footballer - Leicester City F.C., Torquay United F.C., Brentford F.C.
 Scott Houghton - former professional footballer - Tottenham Hotspur, Luton Town, Walsall F.C., Peterborough United
 Stanley Brown (1907-1978) - Cricketer who was active in the late 1930s.

Arlesey at war, 1939–1945

Halifax Bomber crash
On 19 December 1943 
a Handley Page Halifax belonging to 138 Squadron was in a collision with a chimney at Arlesey Brickworks.

The aircraft BB364 (NF-R) had left its base at RAF Tempsford on a training mission.

The crew of nine perished in the subsequent crash.

Hudson crash
On 28 March 1944 a Lockheed Hudson belonging to 161 Squadron RAF crashed on the Arlesey to Stotfold road killing the crew.

The aircraft FK767 had left its base at RAF Tempsford on a training flight.

Sport

The town's football team is Arlesey Town, who play at Hitchin Road.
The town also has a Basketball
team called North Herts Knights

References

External links

 Arlesey Town Council Local resources
 War Memorial Details of those soldiers listed
 

Towns in Bedfordshire
Civil parishes in Bedfordshire
Central Bedfordshire District
Aviation accidents and incidents locations in England